Tory Cave (or Tory's Cave) is a marble solutional cave near New Milford, Connecticut.

While it is of modest size (the big room having enough space for two dozen people) it is said to be the only true cave in Connecticut. To protect bat colonies, the cave is closed to the public. Its name is based on a tale from the American Revolution, in which a Tory (a loyalist to the English monarchy) hid in the cave.
The cave is near the Housatonic River.

In 1996, Joe Hurley, writing in the Record Journal, reported that the cave's unique ecology was threatened by blasting from a nearby quarry.
The cave is home to a blind shrimp-like amphipod called a Stygobromus.

See also
 Connecticut trips: what, when, where

References

Caves of Connecticut
Caves used for hiding
Landforms of Litchfield County, Connecticut
Tourist attractions in Litchfield County, Connecticut
American Revolutionary War articles needing attention